The Children of the Marshland is a 1999 French film directed by Jean Becker.

Plot 
The film is set in a marsh, along the banks of Loire river about ten years after the great war. Riton is afflicted with a bad-tempered wife and three unruly children. Garris lives alone with his recollections of World War I trenches. Their daily life consists of seasonal work and visits from their two pals: Tane, the local train conductor and Amédée, a dreamer and voracious reader of classics.

Cast 
 Jacques Villeret as Riton
 Jacques Gamblin as Garris
 André Dussollier as Amédée
 Michel Serrault as Pépé la Rainette
 Isabelle Carré as Marie
 Eric Cantona as Jo Sardi
 Jacques Boudet as Tane
 Suzanne Flon as Old Cri Cri
 Jacques Dufilho as Old man
 Gisèle Casadesus as Madame Mercier
 Roland Magdane as Felix
 Anne Le Guernec as Mireille

Box office
The film was one of the highest grossing French films for the year, with a gross of $11.3 million.

References

External links 
 

1999 films
French comedy-drama films
1990s French-language films
Films directed by Jean Becker
Films based on French novels
1990s French films